David Edward Joseph Ricketts (7 October 1920 – 11 August 1996) was a British cyclist. He was born in London. He won a bronze medal in the team pursuit at the 1948 Summer Olympics in London, together with Alan Geldard, Tommy Godvin and Wilfred Waters.

In 1939, he finished runner up behind Bill Maxfield at the British National Individual Sprint Championships at Herne Hill.

References

External links
 
 
 

1920 births
1996 deaths
Cyclists from Greater London
English male cyclists
Cyclists at the 1948 Summer Olympics
Olympic cyclists of Great Britain
Olympic bronze medallists for Great Britain
Olympic medalists in cycling
Medalists at the 1948 Summer Olympics